Virginia Reel was an older style of spinning roller coaster characterized by spinning circular "tubs" that zig-zagged down a flat-bottomed track.

Description
Virginia Reels used a side friction-like track resembling a trench. The tubs, which had inward-facing seats built around the perimeter, spun freely on their chassis as they traveled around the track. Instead of big hills or banks, Virginia Reels featured many unbanked turns and switchbacks to spin their tubs as much as possible. Near the end of the ride were a few helices and a relatively steep drop into a tunnel.

History
The Virginia Reel was designed by Henry Elmer Riehl, who named the ride after his daughter, Luna Virginia Riehl. The first Virginia Reel was built in 1908 at Coney Island's Luna Park, where Henry Riehl was superintendent.

The last full-sized Virginia Reel was located at Blackpool Pleasure Beach in England until it closed in 1982. The modern equivalent is the Spinning Wild Mouse roller coaster.

There is one survivor, albeit in miniature and semi-powered form, at Joyland (Great Yarmouth).

A similar ride around the same time, the Tickler, consisted of curved rails and posts forming a zig-zag route down an incline surface. Wheeled circular tubs freely rolled and spun down the incline, guided by the rails and bounced about by the posts.

The ride is also featured as a buildable attraction in the Roller Coaster Tycoon simulation game series.

References

External links
 Pleasure Beach Postcards - Virginia Reel - Many pictures of the Virginia Reel at Pleasure Beach Blackpool
 YouTube: The Pleasure Beach, Blackpool 1920s Footage includes the Virginia Reel
 The End of The Reel - On themagiceye at Joyland: An interview with Ian Beech who operated The Reel at Blackpool Pleasure Beach during its final years of operation.
 The Virginia Reel Gallery - Images documenting the destruction of a classic Blackpool ride on themagiceye at Joyland
 Reeltime Memories - An interview with the daughters of the ride's inventor: Henry Elmer Riehl

Types of roller coaster
Amusement rides based on rail transport